Egor Gerasimov was the defending champion but lost in the quarterfinals to Marius Copil.

Norbert Gombos won the title after defeating Copil 7–6(10–8), 4–6, 6–3 in the final.

Seeds

Draw

Finals

Top half

Bottom half

References
Main Draw
Qualifying Draw

Slovak Open - Men's Singles